Mysteries Shaque is a Hindi action Thriller film of Bollywood directed and produced by Vinod Chhabra. This movie was released in the banner of Maa Shakti Entertainer on 1 October 2004.

Plot
Puja, the daughter of a multi billionaire businessman studying in a college of Canada. She is the sole survival after the death of her parents. Puja's uncle Kumar became trusty of her huge properties. As per the will on turning twenty-one, Pooja will inherit the entire properties in her name. Kumar forces Pooja to leave her studies in Canada and join a college in India with his son Prem so that they get married, and hence the all properties remains back to Uncle Kumar and Prem. In the new college in India, Pooja meets Rohit and his group of friends and a tomboy type lady Simran. Although very first day, Pooja is ragged by Rohit but after a few encounters, they started liking to each other. On the other side, a boy looking exactly like Rohit enters into the plot which has a dark past. A series of murders put Rohit and Puja in danger. The conspiracy against Puja is revealed at the climax.

Cast
 Janki Shah as Puja
 Quber (Dhananjay) Chauhan
 Prem Chopra as Uncle Kumar
 Upasana Singh
 Aarti Puri as Simran
 Dhananjay Chouhan as Rohit

Production
Mysteries Shaque was made at a budget of Rs 2 crore. Janaki Shah said in an interview that director Vinod Chhabra tricked her into a topless scene, a smooching scene and appearing in a bikini in the film. Later she claimed she didn't have problems with the director.

References

External links
 

2004 films
2000s erotic thriller films
Indian erotic thriller films
Indian action thriller films
2004 action thriller films
Indian mystery thriller films
2000s mystery thriller films
2000s Hindi-language films